Buckley is a village in Artesia Township, Iroquois County, Illinois, United States. The population was 600 at the 2010 census. Buckley celebrated its sesquicentennial in 2006.

Geography
Buckley is located in southwestern Iroquois County at  (40.597236, -88.037019). U.S. Route 45 passes through the village, leading north  to Onarga and south  to Loda. I-57 leads north  to Kankakee and south  to Champaign.

Demographics

As of the census of 2000, there were 593 people, 261 households, and 171 families residing in the village. The racial makeup of the village was 97.47% White, 0.17% African American, 0.17% Asian, 2.02% from other races, and 0.17% from two or more races. Hispanic or Latino of any race were 3.37% of the population.

There were 261 households, out of which 28.4% had children under the age of 18 living with them, 55.6% were married couples living together, 8.8% had a female householder with no husband present, and 34.1% were non-families. 32.6% of all households were made up of individuals, and 18.0% had someone living alone who was 65 years of age or older. The average household size was 2.27 and the average family size was 2.84.

In the village, the population was spread out; with 23.6% under the age of 18, 6.2% from 18 to 24, 28.0% from 25 to 44, 18.0% from 45 to 64, and 24.1% who were 65 years of age or older. The median age was 40 years. For every 100 females, there were 97.0 males. For every 100 females age 18 and over, there were 97.0 males.

The median income for a household in the village was $35,781, and the median income for a family was $48,250. Males had a median income of $31,458 versus $21,719 for females. The per capita income for the village was $21,251.  About 5.4% of families and 5.3% of the population were below the poverty line, including 6.7% of those under age 18 and 6.3% of those age 65 or over.

Education 
Buckley is home to St. John's Lutheran School, which is affiliated with St. John's Lutheran Church. The school opened in 1870 and its current building is located at 206 East Main Street.

References

Villages in Iroquois County, Illinois
Villages in Illinois